Miloš Stamenković (born 1 June 1990), is a Serbian football defender.

Career
Stamenković is a product of FK Zemun and Red Star Belgrade youth sportive schools.

On 26 June 2017, Stamenković signed a one-year contract with Irtysh Pavlodar of the Kazakhstan Premier League.

On 25 June 2019, Stamenković returned to Irtysh Pavlodar on a contract until the end of the season, signing a new contract with Irtysh on 21 November 2019.

On 14 July 2022, Ararat-Armenia announced the signing of Stamenković. On 4 March 2023, Stamenković left Ararat-Armenia having played five times for the club.

Career statistics

Club

References

External links
 
 Miloš Stamenković stats at utakmica.rs
 Miloš Stamenković at Footballdatabase

1990 births
Living people
Footballers from Belgrade
Association football defenders
Serbian footballers
FK Proleter Novi Sad players
OFK Mladenovac players
FK BSK Borča players
Serbian SuperLiga players
Serbian expatriate footballers
Armenian Premier League players
FC Ararat Yerevan players
FC Shirak players
FC Stal Kamianske players
FC Irtysh Pavlodar players
FC Rukh Lviv players
FC Akzhayik players
Royale Union Saint-Gilloise players
Ukrainian Premier League players
Challenger Pro League players
Kazakhstan Premier League players
Expatriate footballers in Armenia
Expatriate footballers in Belgium
Expatriate footballers in Kazakhstan
Expatriate footballers in Ukraine
Serbian expatriate sportspeople in Armenia
Serbian expatriate sportspeople in Belgium
Serbian expatriate sportspeople in Kazakhstan
Serbian expatriate sportspeople in Ukraine